Klang Valley Derby is the name given to football matches that involves Selangor and Kuala Lumpur. Both of them were located in the Klang Valley, Malaysia.

History 

The rivalry can be seen as a result of the teams' geographical locations – the federal territory of Kuala Lumpur, the capital of Malaysia, is an enclave of Selangor – Kuala Lumpur was part of the latter until 1974, when it was carved out on 1 February that year and made directly responsible to the Malaysian government. The rivalry between the two teams, which were both located in the Klang Valley, dates back to at least the 1980s. The rivalry peaked when Kuala Lumpur FA was promoted to the Malaysia Super League after a seven-year spell in the second division. WPKL was then relegated back to the Premier League in 2011 after the last meeting of the two clubs. While Selangor FA remained one of the strongest clubs, having consistently stayed in the Super League, the Federal Territory declined even further, slipping as low as into the FAM League, the third division for the 2014 season. As of 2018, Kuala Lumpur FA is now back in the Malaysia Super League, the first division league after 3 years in the Premiere League.

Selangor 
Selangor Association Football League (AFL) was formed in 1905. In 1926, association officials formed a breakaway association called Selangor Football Association (SFA). Dispute between the AFL and the SFA continued for almost ten years before the two sides returned to the negotiating table for the betterment of football. Both groups merged on 22 February 1936, forming the present-day Selangor FA.

Selangor FA is the most successful club in Malaysia, in terms of overall titles won. Domestically, Selangor FA won a record 33 Malaysia Cup, 7 Malaysia Super League titles, 2 Malaysia Premier League titles, 7 Malaysia FAM League titles, 5 FA Cup, 8 Charity Shield, 4 Malaysia President Cup, 2 Malaysia Youth League titles, 13 King's Gold Cups and 1 Agong's Cup. Selangor FA have completed the treble in 1997, 2005 and 2009. In 1984 the treble covered the Malaysia Cup, League Champion and Charity Shield. Both 1997 and 2005 trebles covered the Domestic Cup Double (Malaysia Cup and FA Cup) while the 2009 treble covered the Double (Super League and FA Cup). 1997 was the most successful year for them as they won 4 trophies (Malaysia Cup, FA Cup, Charity Cup and King's Gold Cup) and runners-up for the Agong's Cup.

Kuala Lumpur 
Kuala Lumpur Football Association is the one of the youngest state football teams, having been formed in 1975, but their achievements during the short period made them veterans in the game. Formed as Federal Territory Football Association (FTFA), the association was actually a breakaway group from Selangor FA, following Kuala Lumpur's separation from Selangor to be a Federal Territory in 1974. Led by former F.A. of Selangor secretary K. Rasalingam together with other members Goh Ah Chai, Hamzah Muhammad, M.J. Vincent, Shariff Mustafa, Jeswant Singh and Manickarajah, they saw the need for another association in the Klang Valley due to the growing numbers of clubs.

FTFA was officially formed in 1975 with Tan Sri Hamzah Abu Samah elected as their first president. It was in 1979, that the Federal Territory made their debut in the Malaysia Cup. They then started off as whipping boys but by 1982 were already making waves to be among the top teams in the league although they failed to win any titles. In 1985, Federal Territory reached their first Malaysia Cup final after only competing in the tournament for seven seasons while other states, who have been in the competition since it was inaugurated in 1921, are still trying to reach the final.
FTFA officially changed its name to Kuala Lumpur Football Association (KLFA) in 1987 to better identify itself with the city. Kuala Lumpur joined the ranks of the heavyweights in the Malaysian soccer competition which saw them win the Charity Shield once (1987) in the four appearances, the League twice and the Malaysia Cup three years in a row (1987–1989). Later years saw lean pickings for Kuala Lumpur although they did win the FA Cup three times in 1993, 1994 and 1999, which remains Kuala Lumpur's last major trophy. Unlike their neighbour, Kuala Lumpur have a roller coaster ride jumping between third tier FAM League and first tier Super League.

The derby is among the most one-sided derby, with Selangor overwhelmingly dominant. Kuala Lumpur have a winless drought for 11 years between 2007 till 2018. The derby celebrated its 70th derby on 2011.

The derby occur twice during Piala Sumbangsih, which are in 1987 and 1990. Both were won by Selangor.

List of Matches 
From 1986 to current

*From 1986 till 1993, Merdeka Stadium is a natural ground. It is noted as Kuala Lumpur ground to ease the listing of matches.

Statistics 
From 1986 to current

Last updated: 13 October 2022

Honors

See also 
East Coast Derby
Malayan El'Clasico
North-South Rivalry
 List of association football rivalries
 List of sports rivalries

References

External links 
1990–2011 Records
2011–2012 Records
1986-current Records

Malaysia football derbies
Selangor FA
Kuala Lumpur City F.C.